Varcheh (also Romanized as Warcheh; also known as Varchīn, Varchū, and Vāsheh) is a village in Khorram Dasht Rural District, Kamareh District, Khomeyn County, Markazi Province, Iran. At the 2006 census, its population was 846, in 260 families.

References 

Populated places in Khomeyn County